Gustav Engelbert Holm (1883–1957) was a Swedish farm worker and member of parliament.

Further reading 
Tidens kalender 1949, Stockholm: Tidens förlag, 1948, sid. 207.
Sveriges dödbok 1947-2006, (Cd-Rom), Sveriges Släktforskarförbund

Members of the Andra kammaren
Members of the Riksdag from the Social Democrats
1883 births
1957 deaths
Farmworkers